Martin Gibbons (born 1 March 1953) is a former Irish politician who served as a Teachta Dála (TD) for the Carlow–Kilkenny constituency from 1987 to 1989.

Gibbons was one of 14 Progressive Democrat TDs elected to the 25th Dáil following the 1987 general election, the first election after the party was founded. He was elected for Carlow–Kilkenny, the constituency previously represented by his father Jim Gibbons Snr, a long-serving Fianna Fáil TD and Cabinet Minister.

He was defeated at the 1989 general election, and did not stand for election again. His brother Jim Gibbons Jnr unsuccessfully contested the seat at the 1997 general election.

See also
Families in the Oireachtas

References

1953 births
Living people
Local councillors in County Kilkenny
Progressive Democrats TDs
Members of the 25th Dáil
Irish farmers